Patrick Wall or Pat Wall may refer to:

Pat Wall (1933–1990), British Marxist politician and Labour MP
Patrick D. Wall (1925–2001), British neuroscientist
 Patrick Wall (1916–1998), British Conservative politician and Yorkshire MP, 1954–1987